Christ Church is a small Gothic Revival Anglican church located in Drinagh, County Cork, Ireland. It was completed in 1895 or 1896. It is dedicated to Jesus Christ. It is part of the Diocese of Cork, Cloyne, and Ross.

History 
Christ Church is built in the site of an earlier church completed in 1819, the stone of which was used in the creation of the current church. The building was funded by a loan from the Board of First Fruits. It was consecrated on 28 May 1897.

Architecture 
The church was designed by William Henry Hill.

References

Notes

Sources 

 

Architecture in Ireland
Churches in the Diocese of Cork, Cloyne and Ross
19th-century Church of Ireland church buildings
Gothic Revival church buildings in the Republic of Ireland
19th-century churches in the Republic of Ireland